In Greek mythology, Aethalides (/ɪˈθælɪdiːz, iːˈθælɪdiːz/; Ancient Greek: Αἰθαλίδης) was the name shared by two personages:

 Aethalides, one of the sailors who tried to delude Dionysus. He was turned into a dolphin by the god.
 Aethalides, one of the Argonauts and son of Hermes and Eupolemeia, daughter of King Myrmidon of Phthia.

Notes

References 

 Apollonius Rhodius, Argonautica translated by Robert Cooper Seaton (1853-1915), R. C. Loeb Classical Library Volume 001. London, William Heinemann Ltd, 1912. Online version at the Topos Text Project.
 Apollonius Rhodius, Argonautica. George W. Mooney. London. Longmans, Green. 1912. Greek text available at the Perseus Digital Library.
 Gaius Julius Hyginus, Fabulae from The Myths of Hyginus translated and edited by Mary Grant. University of Kansas Publications in Humanistic Studies. Online version at the Topos Text Project.

Dionysus in mythology
Metamorphoses into animals in Greek mythology